Earheart is a surname. Notable people with the surname include:

 James E. Earheart Jr. (1913–1942), a Silver Star-decorated US Marine killed in action during World War II
 Billy Earheart (born 1954), an organist and piano player member of the Amazing Rhythm Aces

See also
USS Earheart (APD-113), a US Navy ship named after James E. Earheart Jr.
 Earhart
 Earnhardt